The 2018–19 Algerian Ligue Professionnelle 2 was the 55th season of the Algerian Ligue Professionnelle 2 since its establishment, and its fourth season under its current title. A total of 16 teams will contest the league.

Team changes
The following teams have changed division since the 2017–18 season.

To Algerian Ligue Professionnelle 2 

Relegated from Ligue 1
 USM Blida
 US Biskra
 USM El Harrach

Promoted from Championnat National Amateur
 USM Annaba
 NC Magra
 ES Mostaganem

From Algerian Ligue Professionnelle 2 

Promoted to Ligue 1
 MO Béjaïa
 AS Aïn M'lila
 CA Bordj Bou Arreridj

Relegated to Championnat National Amateur
 CA Batna
 GC Mascara
 CRB Aïn Fakroun

Team overview

Stadiums and locations

League table

Result table

Clubs season-progress

Positions by round

Season statistics

Top scorers

Media coverage

See also
 2018–19 Algerian Ligue Professionnelle 1
 2018–19 Algerian Cup

References

External links
 Ligue de Football Professionnel
 Algerian Football Federation

Algerian Ligue 2 seasons
2
Algeria